Federico García (born 3 September 1951) is a Chilean alpine skier. He competed in two events at the 1976 Winter Olympics.

References

1951 births
Living people
Chilean male alpine skiers
Olympic alpine skiers of Chile
Alpine skiers at the 1976 Winter Olympics
Place of birth missing (living people)
20th-century Chilean people